Wang Zheng (pinyin: Wáng Zhēng) is a Singaporean-based News Anchor contracted under MediaCorp for Hello Singapore, News Tonight and Singapore Today.

Career
Wang is a Mediacorp Channel 8's news presenter and journalist since March 2005. She left Mediacorp Channel 8 in July 2012 and joined Channel NewsAsia as a Shanghai correspondent till 2013.

Currently, Wang has gone back to Mediacorp Channel 8 to be a news presenter for News 8 at One (1点新闻), Hello Singapore (狮城有约), Singapore Today (狮城6点半). She is also News Tonight (晚间新闻), MediaCorp Channel 8 and MediaCorp Channel U news, presenter. Also, Wang is the co-host of Mediacorp Channel U's Current Affair Program - World This Week (世界一周) and Channel 8 News & Current Affairs Program - 流行挖哇WOW host.

Although Wang joined Mediacorp in March 2005, she wasn't nominated for Best News / Current Affairs Presenter in Star Awards 2005 and Star Awards 2006, due to the lack of eligible nominees. Starting from 2007, she was then nominated for Best News / Current Affairs Presenter, replacing Serene Loo in Star Awards 2007 and Star Awards 2009 Wang wasn't nominated for Best News Presenter in Star Awards 2008, as there wasn't any ceremony held on that year. In Star Awards 2010, due to the lack of eligible nominees, once again, she wasn't nominated for Best News Presenter.

In Star Awards 2011 and Star Awards 2012, she was then nominated for Best News Presenter replacing Ng Siew Leng, she was also nominated for Best News Story in Star Awards 2011.

In 2013, she left Mediacorp Channel 8 and joined Channel NewsAsia, hence she wasn't nominated for Best News Presenter in Star Awards 2013. Wang was also nominated for Best News Presenter or Anchor and Best Single News Story / Report (10 min or less)  in Asian Television Awards.

Education
Wang graduated from Beijing International Studies University (formerly known as Beijing Second Foreign Language University).

Compilation album

Awards/Achievement

References

External links
Wang Zheng's Facebook

1979 births
Living people
Singaporean journalists
Singaporean television personalities
Singaporean women journalists